Hugh Seidman (born 1940 in Brooklyn, New York) is an American poet.

Life
He is a graduate of Polytechnic Institute of New York University.

He has taught writing at the University of Wisconsin, Yale University, Columbia University, the College of William and Mary, The New School.

His work appeared in The Brooklyn Rail, Harper's, The Paris Review, Virginia Quarterly Review.

He lives in New York City.

Awards
 2004 Green Rose Prize from New Issues Press (Western Michigan University) for SOMEBODY STAND UP AND SING
 2003, 1990 New York Foundation for the Arts (NYFA) grant 
 1990 Camden Poetry Award (Walt Whitman Center for the Arts)
 1985, 1972, 1970 National Endowment for the Arts fellowship
 1971 New York State Creative Artists Public Service grant
 1970 Yale Series of Younger Poets Competition

Works
"Case History: Melancholia", Virginia Quarterly Review, Spring 2000 
"The Daily Racing Form", Virginia Quarterly Review, Spring 2000 
"On the Other Side of the Poem", Virginia Quarterly Review, Spring 2000 
 
 
 
 
 
 12 views of Freetown, 1 view of Bumbuna, (Half Moon Bay Press), 2003.

Anthologies

Criticism

References

External links
"Author's website"
"INTERVIEW: Hugh Seidman", Jacket 31, October 2006

American male poets
1940 births
Living people
University of Wisconsin–Madison faculty
Yale University faculty
College of William & Mary faculty
The New School faculty
Polytechnic Institute of New York University alumni